The Boston Women's Heritage Trail is a series of walking tours in Boston, Massachusetts, leading past sites important to Boston women's history. The tours wind through several neighborhoods, including the Back Bay and Beacon Hill, commemorating women such as Abigail Adams, Amelia Earhart, and Phillis Wheatley. The guidebook includes seven walks and introduces more than 200 Boston women.

The BWHT was created in 1989 by a group of Boston schoolteachers, librarians, and students. It is funded by the nonprofit Boston Educational Development Foundation. The BWHT presents teacher workshops, guided walks, and other activities to promote women's history.

Walking tours

The list of BWHT walking tours currently includes tours of the Back Bay (East), Back Bay (West), Beacon Hill, Charlestown, Chinatown/South Cove, Dorchester, Downtown, Jamaica Plain, Lower Roxbury, Roxbury, the South End, and West Roxbury. It also includes the Artists Walk, which focuses on local women artists, and the Ladies Walk, which commemorates Abigail Adams, Lucy Stone, and Phillis Wheatley.

Artists

The Artists walk centers on the Back Bay, where many women artists have lived, worked, and exhibited. The walk was designed to complement the 2001 Museum of Fine Arts exhibition, A Studio of Her Own: Women Artists in Boston 1870–1940. Women mentioned include Helen M. Knowlton, Anne Whitney, and others.

Back Bay East

The Back Bay East walk begins and ends at the Public Garden. Women mentioned include:

 Emily Greene Balch, economist, sociologist and pacifist; winner of the Nobel Peace Prize
 Amy Beach, composer
 Isabella Stewart Gardner, art collector and founder of the Gardner Museum
 Catherine Hammond Gibson, original owner of the Gibson House Museum
 Mary Elizabeth Haskell, founder of the Haskell School for Girls
 Harriet Hemenway and Minna Hall, founders of the Massachusetts Audubon Society
 Julia Ward Howe, abolitionist, activist, and author of "The Battle Hymn of the Republic"
 Elma Lewis, arts educator and founder of the National Center of Afro-American Artists
 Florence Luscomb, architect and women's suffragist
 Mary May, founder of the Brimmer and May School
 Julia Oliver O'Neil, famous for marching in parades with her ten daughters in matching outfits
 Lucina W. Prince, founder of the Prince School of Salesmanship
 Belle P. Rand, founder of the French Library and Cultural Center
 Sarah Choate Sears, art patron and artist
 Anne Sexton, Pulitzer-winning poet
 Mary Pickard Winsor, founder of the Winsor School
 Sculptors Theo Alice Ruggles Kitson, Anna Coleman Ladd, Mary Moore, Bashka Paeff, Lilian Swann Saarinen, Nancy Schön, Katharine Lane Weems, and Anne Whitney

Also mentioned are Fisher College, Simmons College, and the Winsor School.

Back Bay West

This walk starts at the Boston Public Library in Copley Square and ends at the Boston Women's Memorial on the Commonwealth Avenue mall. Women mentioned include:

 Abigail Adams, first lady and presidential advisor
 Sister Ann Alexis, administrator of Carney Hospital and the Daughters of Charity of Saint Vincent de Paul
 Mary Antin, author and immigration rights activist
 Alice Stone Blackwell, women's suffragist, journalist, and human rights advocate
 Melnea Cass, civil rights activist
 Lucretia Crocker, science educator
 Charlotte Cushman, actress and art patron
 Carolyn L. Dewing, founder of the School of Fashion Design
 Mary Baker Eddy, founder of the Church of Christ, Scientist
 Katharine Gibbs, founder of Gibbs College
 Louise Imogen Guiney, poet, essayist, and editor
 Anne Hutchinson, religious dissenter
 Alice M. Jordan, founder of the New England Round Table of Children's Librarians
 Mary Morton Kehew, social reform leader
 Ellen Lanyon, artist
 Elma Lewis, arts educator and founder of the National Center of Afro-American Artists
 Lucy Miller Mitchell, pioneering educator
 Maria Mitchell, astronomer
 Cecilia Payne-Gaposchkin, astronomer
 Frances Rich, sculptor
 Ellen Swallow Richards, pioneering environmental chemist
 Beryl Robinson, educator and storyteller
 Sarah Choate Sears, art patron and artist
 Isobel Sinesi of the School of Fashion Design
 Muriel S. Snowden, community activist
 Lucy Stone, suffragist and founder of the Woman's Journal
 Anne Sullivan, teacher of Helen Keller
 Phillis Wheatley, poet
 Marathon runners Joan Benoit, Bobbi Gibb, Nina Kuscsik, Rosa Mota, and Fatuma Roba
 Sculptors Meredith Bergmann, Yvette Compagnion, Meta Vaux Warrick Fuller, Penelope Jencks, Theo Alice Ruggles Kitson, Amelia Peabody, Anne Whitney, Frances Rich, and Nancy Schön
 Artists Cecilia Beaux, Susan Hinckley Bradley, Margaret Fitzhugh Browne, Mary Cassatt, Adelaide Cole Chase, Gertrude Fiske, Lilian Westcott Hale, Marie Danforth Page, Lilla Cabot Perry, Louise Stimson, and Sarah Wyman Whitman, 
 Philanthropists Ednah Dow Cheney, Pauline Durant, Fanny Mason, Abby W. May, Pauline Agassiz Shaw, Jane Alexander, and Eileen Reilly
 Religious leaders Abbie Child, Dr. Elsa Meder, Elizabeth Rice, Alice Hageman, and Donna Day Lower
 Award-winning crafters Lydia Bush-Brown Head, Louise Chrimes, Winifred Crawford, Sister Magdalen, Margaret Rogers, Mary Crease Sears, and Josephine H. Shaw 
 Exeter Street Theater owners Viola and Florence Berlin

Beacon Hill

The Beacon Hill walk begins at the State House and winds through Beacon Hill, often in parallel with the Black Heritage Trail. Women mentioned include:

 Louisa May Alcott, author
 Ruth Batson, civil rights activist
 Blanche Woodson Braxton, the first African-American woman to be admitted to the Massachusetts Bar Association
 Maria Weston Chapman, founder of the Boston Female Anti-Slavery Society 
 Ellen Craft, escaped slave, author, and educator
 Rebecca Lee Crumpler, the first African-American woman physician
 Margaret Deland, author
 Mary Dyer, one of the four executed Quakers known as the Boston martyrs
 Annie Adams Fields, author
 Louise Imogen Guiney, author
 Harriet Hayden, African-American abolitionist
 Anna E. Hirsch, the first woman president of the Board of Trustees of New England School of Law
 Julia Ward Howe, abolitionist, activist, and author of "The Battle Hymn of the Republic"
 Anne Hutchinson, religious dissenter
 Sarah Orne Jewett, author
 Mary Eliza Mahoney, the first professionally trained African-American nurse
 Sophia Palmer and Mary E. P. Davis, founders of the American Nurses Association
 Susan Paul, African-American abolitionist
 Elizabeth Peabody, founder of the first English-language kindergarten in the U.S.
 Rose Standish Nichols, landscape architect
 Linda Richards, the first professionally trained American nurse
 Florida Ruffin Ridley, civil rights activist
 Josephine St. Pierre Ruffin, African-American publisher, civil rights leader, and women's suffragist
 Maria W. Stewart, African-American abolitionist
 Hepzibah Swan, socialite and art patron
 Harriet Tubman, African-American abolitionist, women's suffragist, and Union spy who spent time in Boston
 Anne Whitney, sculptor, including Samuel Adams statue at Faneuil Hall
 Marie Elizabeth Zakrzewska, physician and founder of the New England Hospital for Women and Children
 Sisters of St. Margaret, founders of St. Monica's Home
 Students of the Portia School of Law
 Female founders of the Vilna Shul

Charlestown

Women mentioned on the Charlestown walk include:

 Rebecca Lee Crumpler, the first African-American woman physician
 Charlotte Cushman, actress
 Julia Harrington Duff, the first Irish-American woman to serve on the Boston School Committee
 Sarah Josepha Hale, author, instrumental in the creation of Thanksgiving Day in the U.S. and the Bunker Hill Monument
 Harriot Kezia Hunt, an early female physician
 Rosie the Riveter, in connection with the 8,000 women who worked at the Charlestown Navy Yard
 Squaw Sachem, Pawtucket leader
 Elizabeth McLean Smith, sculptor and president of the New England Sculptors Association
 Elizabeth Foster Vergoose, also known as Mother Goose

Chinatown/South Cove

The Chinatown/South Cove walk begins at the Boston Common Visitor Center, passes through Chinatown, and ends at Park Square. Women mentioned include:

 Sarah Caldwell, opera conductor and impresario
 Ednah Dow Littlehale Cheney, writer, reformer, and philanthropist
 Chew Shee Chin, founder of the New England Chinese Women's Association
 Harriet Clisby, physician and founder of the Women's Educational and Industrial Union
 Jennie Collins, humanitarian, and one of the first working-class American women to publish a book
 Helena Dudley, director of Denison House
 Amelia Earhart, aviator and social worker at Denison House
 Ruby Foo, restaurateur
 Margaret Fuller, journalist, critic, and women's rights advocate associated with American transcendentalism
 Pauline Hopkins, author, editor of The Colored American
 Mary Morton Kehew, social reform leader
 Rose Lok, aviator, the first Chinese-American woman pilot to solo at Logan Airport
 Mary A. Mahan, first woman to be admitted to the Massachusetts Bar Association
 The Maryknoll Sisters
 Annie McKay, Boston's first school nurse
 Rose Finkelstein Norwood, labor organizer
 Julia O'Connor, labor organizer
 Mary Kenney O'Sullivan, labor organizer
 Elizabeth Peabody, founder of the first English-language kindergarten in the U.S. 
 Vida Dutton Scudder, co-founder of Denison House
 Hannah Sabbagh Shakir, founder of the Lebanese-Syrian Ladies' Aid Society
 Frances Stern, one of the first nutritionists in the United States
 Phillis Wheatley, poet
 Members of the International Ladies' Garment Workers' Union 
 Members of the Boston Women's Trade Union League
 Residents of the YWCA "Working Girls Home"

Dorchester

The Uphams Corner walk in Dorchester, developed by students at Codman Academy, is the first in a planned series of Dorchester walks. Women mentioned include:

 Alice Stone Blackwell, women's suffragist, journalist, and human rights advocate
 Elida Rumsey Fowle, Civil War volunteer and adoptive mother of two emancipated slave children
 Sarah Wentworth Apthorp Morton, poet
 Anna Clapp Harris Smith, founder of the Animal Rescue League
 Hepzibah Swan, socialite and art patron
 Geraldine Trotter, editor and activist
 "Ann & Betty", two slaves buried in Dorchester's oldest graveyard
 Local women's abolitionist groups

Downtown

Starting at the State House and ending at the corner of Franklin and Washington Streets, the Downtown walk passes some of Boston's oldest historic sites. Women mentioned include:

 Abigail Adams, wife of John Adams
 Hannah Adams, the first woman in the U.S. who worked professionally as a writer
 Jennie Loitman Barron, the first woman appointed to the Massachusetts Superior Court 
 Clara Barton, founder of the American Red Cross
 Alice Stone Blackwell, women's suffragist, journalist, and human rights advocate
 Maria Weston Chapman, founder of the Boston Female Anti-Slavery Society 
 Lydia Maria Child, abolitionist and women's rights activist
 Lucretia Crocker, science educator
 Sheila Levrant de Bretteville, artist
 Dorothea Dix, activist on behalf of the indigent insane who created the first generation of American mental asylums
 Julia Harrington Duff, the first Irish-American woman to serve on the Boston School Committee
 Mary Dyer, one of the four executed Quakers known as the Boston martyrs
 Mary Baker Eddy, founder of the Church of Christ, Scientist
 Annie Adams Fields, author
 Eliza Lee Cabot Follen, author and abolitionist
 Abiah Franklin, mother of Benjamin Franklin
 Sarah and Angelina Grimké, abolitionists and women's suffragists
 Mary Tileston Hemenway, philanthropist
 Harriet Hosmer, sculptor
 Anne Hutchinson, religious dissenter
 Helen Hunt Jackson, author
 Edmonia Lewis, sculptor
 Mary Livermore, journalist and women's rights advocate
 Grace Lorch, teacher and civil rights activist
 Amy Lowell, poet
 Florence Luscomb, architect and women's suffragist
 Abby May, school founder, activist, and one of the first social workers in Massachusetts
 Jane Mecom, sister and confidant of Benjamin Franklin
 Elizabeth Murray, businesswoman and proto-feminist during the American Revolution
 Judith Sargent Murray, women's rights advocate, essayist, playwright, and poet
 Mary Kenney O'Sullivan, labor organizer
 Sarah Parker Remond, African-American abolitionist
 Susanna Rowson, playwright and actress
 Josephine St. Pierre Ruffin, African-American publisher, civil rights leader, and women's suffragist
 Frances Slanger, the first American nurse in Europe to be killed in combat during World War II
 Lucy Stone, suffragist and founder of the Woman's Journal
 Anne Sullivan, teacher of Helen Keller
 Elizabeth Foster Vergoose, also known as Mother Goose
 Mercy Otis Warren, political writer of the American Revolution
 Phillis Wheatley, poet
 Female dressmakers, milliners, and operators of Dress Reform Parlors
 Female lecturers at the Tremont Temple
 Female organizers of the New England Holocaust Memorial 
 Female speakers at Faneuil Hall, including Susette La Flesche and Sarah Josepha Hale

Jamaica Plain

Women mentioned on the Jamaica Plain walk include:

 Emily Greene Balch, economist, sociologist and pacifist; winner of the Nobel Peace Prize
 Ednah Dow Littlehale Cheney, writer, reformer, and philanthropist
 Mary Emilda Curley, wife of James Michael Curley
 Susan Walker Fitzgerald, the first female Democrat elected to the Massachusetts State Legislature
 Margaret Fuller, journalist, critic, and women's rights advocate associated with American transcendentalism
 Maud Cuney Hare, musician, musicologist, and civil rights activist
 Elizabeth Peabody, founder of the first English-language kindergarten in the U.S.
 Sylvia Plath, poet
 Ellen Swallow Richards, pioneering environmental chemist
 Mary Joseph Rogers, founder of the Maryknoll Sisters
 Pauline Agassiz Shaw, philanthropist and social reformer
 Judith Winsor Smith, abolitionist and women's suffragist
 Lucy Stone, suffragist and founder of the Woman's Journal
 Marie Elizabeth Zakrzewska, physician and founder of the New England Hospital for Women and Children

Ladies Walk

The Ladies Walk celebrates the lives of First Lady Abigail Adams, suffragist Lucy Stone, and poet Phillis Wheatley. It starts at the Boston Women's Memorial on Commonwealth Avenue and ends at Faneuil Hall.

Lower Roxbury

Women mentioned on the Lower Roxbury walk include:

 Melnea Cass, civil rights activist
 Mildred Daniels, community activist
 Sisters residing at the local Carmelite Monastery
 Students of Girls' High School

North End Walk

The North End walk begins at Faneuil Hall, passes through the North End, and ends at St. Leonard's Church, one of the first Italian churches in the U.S. It overlaps at several points with the
Freedom Trail. Women mentioned on this walk include:

 Charlotte Cushman, actress
 Goody Glover, the last person to be hanged in Boston as a witch
 Fanny Goldstein, librarian and the founder of Jewish Book Week
 Edith Guerrier, founder of the Saturday Evening Girls
 Sarah Josepha Hale, founder of the Boston Seaman's Aid Society
 Lina Frank Hecht, founder of the Hebrew Industrial School
 Harriot Kezia Hunt, an early female physician
 Rose Fitzgerald Kennedy, mother of John F. Kennedy
 Clementina Poto Langone, Italian-American civic leader
 Judith Sargent Murray, women's rights advocate, essayist, playwright, and poet
 Rachel Walker Revere, wife of Paul Revere
 Pauline Agassiz Shaw, founder of the North Bennet Street Industrial School
 Helen Osborne Storrow, philanthropist
 Sophie Tucker, entertainer
 Female fundraisers for St. Leonard's Church

Roxbury

Women mentioned on the Roxbury walk include:

 Melnea Cass, civil rights activist
 Jessie Gideon Garnett, the first African-American woman dentist in Boston
 Ellen Swepson Jackson, educator and activist
 Elma Lewis, arts educator and founder of the National Center of Afro-American Artists
 Mary Eliza Mahoney, the first professionally trained African-American nurse
 Lucy Miller Mitchell, daycare pioneer, co-founder of Head Start and Freedom House
 Sarah-Ann Shaw, television reporter
 Muriel S. Snowden, co-founder of Freedom House, recipient of MacArthur Genius Grant
 Maude Trotter Steward, newspaper editor
 Geraldine Trotter, editor and activist

South End

The South End walk starts at Back Bay Station and ends at the Boston Center for the Arts. Women mentioned on the Sound End walk include:

 Louisa May Alcott, author
 Tina Allen, sculptor
 Maria Louise Baldwin, African-American educator and civic leader
 Mary McLeod Bethune, educator and school founder
 Melnea Cass, civil rights activist
 Hattie B. Cooper, leader of the Women's Home Missionary Society
 Lucretia Crocker, science educator
 Estella Crosby, co-founder of the Boston branch of the National Housewives League
 Wilhelmina Marguerita Crosson, educator and early advocate of black history education
 Rebecca Lee Crumpler, the first African-American woman physician
 Fern Cunningham, sculptor; created the first sculpture honoring a woman (Harriet Tubman) in a Boston public space
 Mildred Davenport, renowned African-American dancer and dance instructor 
 Mary Baker Eddy, founder of the Church of Christ, Scientist
 Meta Vaux Warrick Fuller, artist, sculptor
 Frieda Garcia, community activist
 Anna Bobbit Gardner, the first African-American woman to be awarded a bachelor's degree from the New England Conservatory of Music
 Louise Imogen Guiney, poet, essayist, and editor
 Harriet Boyd Hawes, pioneering archaeologist
 Coretta Scott King, civil rights activist and wife of Martin Luther King Jr.
 Annie McKay, Boston's first school nurse
 Cora Reid McKerrow, local businesswoman
 Louise Chandler Moulton, author and critic
 Mary Safford-Blake, the first woman gynecologist
 Susie King Taylor, escaped slave, author, and the first African-American Army nurse
 Harriet Tubman, African-American abolitionist, women's suffragist, and Union spy who spent time in Boston
 Myrna Vázquez, renowned actress in Puerto Rico; South End community activist
 Anna Quincy Waterston, author
 E. Virginia Williams, founder of the Boston Ballet
 Mary Evans Wilson, founder of the Women's Service Club
 Community activists Jeanette Hajjar, Helen Morton, and Paula Oyola
 Members of the Boston Ladies' Auxiliary of the Brotherhood of Sleeping Car Porters
 Members of the Lebanese-Syrian Ladies' Aid Society
 Students of the Boston Normal School and the New England Female Medical College
 Residents of the Bethany Home for Young Women, St. Helena’s House, and the Franklin Square House

West Roxbury

Women mentioned on the West Roxbury walk include:

 Kathleen Coffey, first woman Chief Justice of West Roxbury District Court
 Mary Draper, Revolutionary war activist
 Margaret Fuller, journalist, critic, and women's rights advocate associated with American transcendentalism
 Sophia Ripley, feminist associated with American transcendentalism
 Evelyn Shakir, Lebanese-American scholar and author 
 Marian Walsh, Massachusetts state senator
 Local activists Alice Hennessey, Ellen McGill, and Pamela Seigle

See also 
 Freedom Trail
 Black Heritage Trail
 Salem Women's Heritage Trail

References 

Further reading

External links 
 Official website of the Boston Women's Heritage Trail

History of Boston
Historic trails and roads in Massachusetts
Urban heritage trails
Tourist attractions in Boston
History of women in Massachusetts
1989 establishments in Massachusetts
Women in Boston